All Night Long is the fifth studio album by the American hard rock band Buckcherry. The album was released worldwide on August 3, 2010.

Promotion and release
In an online video singer Josh Todd and guitarist Keith Nelson heavily hinted at several track titles that will feature on the upcoming album. The title track was available for free download on May 4, 2010, via their Facebook and Twitter accounts.

They also released another new song called "Our World" in aid of the BP disaster in the Gulf of Mexico. "As musicians who have the benefit of the spotlight from time to time, we feel it is our duty to aid in raising awareness and financial support to help remedy the awful situation in the
Gulf Of Mexico. It is so important that each and every one of us do what we
can to help those out whose lives have been harshly impacted by the oil
spill." – Josh Todd on the BP oil spill.

"All Night Long" appeared in a video package highlighting Wrestlemania XXVII.

The album sold around 28,000 units in its first week of release to land at position No. 10 on The Billboard 200 chart.

Track listing

Personnel
Josh Todd – lead vocals
Keith Nelson – lead guitar, backing vocals
Stevie D. – rhythm guitar, backing vocals
Jimmy "Two Fingers" Ashhurst – bass guitar, backing vocals
Xavier Muriel – drums, percussion
Mixed by Mike Fraser

References

Buckcherry albums
2010 albums
Eleven Seven Label Group albums